Roy Burns (November 30, 1935 – May 2, 2018)  was an American drummer, teacher, and percussion manufacturer.

Career
Burns was born in Emporia, Kansas. Louie Bellson heard him play in Kansas City and advised him to study in New York City. In August 1955, at the age of 20, Burns left Kansas with $300 and a drum set to study drumming in New York City. Within a year, he was Woody Herman's drummer. Shortly after, he left to join Benny Goodman's band, which was having a resurgence due to the film The Benny Goodman Story (1956). In 1958, Burns was with Goodman's band as they toured Europe and recorded several albums at the Brussels World's Fair.

In 1960, he was a teacher and studio musician with the NBC Orchestra, The Merv Griffin Show, and The Tonight Show. From 1968–1980, he worked for the Rogers Drum Company and traveled the world as a clinician. In 1980, he began writing a column in Modern Drummer magazine which ran until 1992. In 1980, he and Ron Marquez started Aquarian Accessories to manufacture percussion equipment.

Discography

As leader
 Skin Burns (Roulette, 1963)
 Big, Bad & Beautiful (FPM, 1973)

As sideman
 Roland Hanna, Destry Rides Again (ATCO,  1959)
 Roland Hanna, Easy to Love (ATCO, 1960)
 Chubby Jackson, Chubby Jackson Discovers Maria Marshall (Crown, 1961)
 Charlie Shavers, Girl of My Dreams (Everest, 1960)

References

External links
 At Drummerworld
 NAMM Oral History Interview

1935 births
Living people
People from Emporia, Kansas
Musicians from Kansas
20th-century American drummers
20th-century American male musicians
American male drummers